Réseau Guerlédan was a short-lived railway in Côtes-du-Nord (now Côtes-d'Armor) which operated from 1978 to 1979.

History

It ran along the abandoned metre gauge trackbed of the Réseau Breton (RB). Statutory powers to operate the line were inherited from the RB because lengths of rail had been left in place where there had formerly been level crossings. With the opening of the line, the Réseau Guerlédan became the smallest (in terms of track gauge) public railway in the world, taking the title from the Romney, Hythe and Dymchurch Railway. A fleet of British-built steam locomotives, based on famous narrow gauge designs were produced for use on the line, however only two steam locomotives saw service on the line.

Closure

The reason for the railway's closure was the occupation of the station at Caurel by the local mayor who subsequently let the facility to a member of his family. This seriously compromised the railway operation and as a result, the railway was cut back to terminate  from Caurel.

There is a myth that the railway was closed after a kidnap attempt on the owner's son and that the operating capital for the following season was employed in effecting his return. However, the son himself, Shôn Ellerton, has stated that he has no recollection of this.

Locomotives

Four steam locomotives were built in the UK for the railway, all of which survive on the Fairbourne Railway. Only France and Jubilee were shipped to the Réseau Guerlédan - the remaining two were stored.

After closure, Jubilee, France, the Galloping Goose railcar and the rolling stock returned to the UK and were kept in storage until the Ellerton family purchased the Fairbourne Railway in North Wales in 1984. The stock has been in service there ever since. Jubilee was renamed Yeo and France was renamed Sherpa. Odd Job was left in France.

Other locomotives

These locomotives were built for the line, however were never shipped to France.

Rolling stock
The Réseau Guerlédan operated a number of carriages. As of 2011, three of these were located on the  Evesham Vale Light Railway in Warwickshire, United Kingdom.

References

Further reading

12¼ in gauge railways in France
Fairbourne Railway